William Lennox Lascelles FitzGerald-de Ros, 22nd Baron de Ros of Helmsley, PC, DL (1 September 1797 – 6 January 1874), was a British soldier and Conservative politician. A general in the Army, he also held political office as Captain of the Yeomen of the Guard in 1852 and between 1858 and 1859.

Background
FitzGerald-de Ros was born into an Anglo-Irish aristocratic family at Thames Ditton, Surrey, the third son of Lord Henry FitzGerald, fourth son of The 1st Duke of Leinster and Lady Emily Lennox. His paternal uncle was Lord Edward FitzGerald, the Irish revolutionary. His mother was Charlotte FitzGerald-de Ros, 20th Baroness de Ros, while Henry FitzGerald-de Ros, 21st Baron de Ros, was his elder brother. He matriculated at Christ Church, Oxford in 1815, graduating B.A. in 1819 and M.A. in 1822.

Military career
As a younger son, de Ros embarked upon a military career, joining the Life Guards as a cornet on 29 March 1819. He subsequently became a lieutenant on 24 August 1821, a captain on 23 October 1824, a major on 5 June 1827 and a lieutenant-colonel on 8 September 1831. In July 1835, de Ros and the Earl of Durham travelled to the Black Sea for half a year to investigate Russian military preparations. He was appointed a Gentleman Usher Quarter Waiter to Queen Victoria in 1836, but had surrendered the post by 1839, when he inherited the barony of de Ros on the death of his eldest brother (a middle brother, Arthur, had predeceased them). He became a colonel on 9 November 1846, and was appointed Deputy Lieutenant of the Tower of London on 13 February 1852.

Lord de Ros served as Quartermaster-General for the British Army in Turkey during the Crimean War between April and July 1854, being promoted major-general on 20 June 1854. Due to a severe attack of fever in July, he was forced to return home as the army embarked for the Crimea. He was promoted lieutenant-general on 12 March 1861, appointed colonel of the 4th (Queen's Own) Hussars on 6 February 1865, and promoted general on 10 November 1868.

Political career
In February 1852 Lord de Ros was appointed Captain of the Yeomen of the Guard in the Earl of Derby's first administration, and sworn of the Privy Council. The government fell in December 1852, but when Derby returned to office in February 1858, de Ros was once again made Captain of the Yeomen of the Guard. He continued in this post until Derby resigned in June 1859.

Family
Lord de Ros married his second cousin Lady Georgiana Lennox (Molecombe, Sussex, 30 September 1795 – London, 15 December 1891), daughter of Charles Lennox, 4th Duke of Richmond, his father's first cousin, in London on 7 June 1824. They had three children:

Hon. Frances Charlotte FitzGerald-de Ros (1825– 21 February 1851), unmarried and without issue.
Dudley FitzGerald-de Ros, 23rd Baron de Ros (1827–1907).
Hon. Blanche Arthur Georgina FitzGerald-de Ros (1832 – 10 March 1910), married on 11 July 1865 James Rannie Swinton (see Clan Swinton) (died December 1888, also without issue).

Lord de Ros died at Old Court, Strangford, County Down, in January 1874, aged 76, and was succeeded in the barony by his only son, Dudley. Lady de Ros died in London in December 1891, aged 96.

References

External links
 Introduction De Ros Papers, Public Record Office of Northern Ireland

23
William
1797 births
1874 deaths
British Army generals
British Army personnel of the Crimean War
Members of the Privy Council of the United Kingdom
Gentlemen Ushers
British Life Guards officers
People from Thames Ditton